Westchester is a census-designated place (CDP) and neighborhood in  Miami-Dade County, Florida. Prior to the 2020 U.S. Census, the neighboring University Park CDP was merged into Westchester CDP, effectively doubling its geography and population. Per the 2020 census, the population was 56,384.

Geography
It is bordered to the north by Sweetwater and Fontainebleu, to the east by Coral Terrace, to the south by Olympia Heights and Westwood Lakes, and to the west by Tamiami. The former University Park CDP occupies the west half of the current Westchester CDP. Florida International University is in the northwest portion of the CDP.

Demographics

2020 census

Note: the US Census treats Hispanic/Latino as an ethnic category. This table excludes Latinos from the racial categories and assigns them to a separate category. Hispanics/Latinos can be of any race.

As of the 2020 United States census, there were 56,384 people, 8,831 households, and 6,980 families residing in the CDP.

2000 census
As of the census of 2000, there were 30,271 people, 9,764 households, and 7,947 families residing in the CDP. The racial makeup of the CDP was 93.78% White (13.7% were Non-Hispanic White,) 0.61% African American, 0.04% Native American, 0.51% Asian, 2.81% from other races, and 2.23% from two or more races. Hispanic or Latino of any race were 85.31% of the population.

There were 9,764 households, out of which 28.0% had children under the age of 18 living with them, 60.5% were married couples living together, 15.7% had a female householder with no husband present, and 18.6% were non-families. 14.8% of all households were made up of individuals, and 8.6% had someone living alone who was 65 years of age or older.  The average household size was 3.07 and the average family size was 3.33.

In the CDP, the population was spread out, with 18.7% under the age of 18, 7.2% from 18 to 24, 26.7% from 25 to 44, 24.4% from 45 to 64, and 23.0% who were 65 years of age or older.  The median age was 43 years. For every 100 females, there were 87.2 males.  For every 100 females age 18 and over, there were 83.4 males.

The median income for a household in the CDP was $40,762, and the median income for a family was $44,863. Males had a median income of $29,629 versus $24,235 for females. The per capita income for the CDP was $17,264.  About 8.5% of families and 11.8% of the population were below the poverty line, including 13.0% of those under age 18 and 13.0% of those age 65 or over.

As of 2000, speakers of Spanish  accounted for 88.81% of residents (many of whom also speak English);  those who spoke only English accounted for 10.78% of the population.

As of 2000, Westchester had the highest percentage of Cuban residents in the US, with 65.69% of the populace (the second highest percentage was Hialeah, which made up 62.12% of its populace.) It had the eighteenth highest percentage of Nicaraguan residents in the US, at 2.25% of the population, and the ninety-third highest percentage of Colombian residents in the US, at 1.77% of its population (tied with South Miami and Princeton, FL.)

Government and infrastructure
The Miami-Dade Fire Rescue operates Station 3 Tropical Park in Westchester.

Education
The community of Westchester is home to eight public schools administered by Miami-Dade County Public Schools, four Catholic private elementary and secondary schools, one private Roman Catholic college, and one public university.

Public schools
 High schools
 Miami Coral Park High School
 Southwest Miami Senior High School (Olympia Heights, serves southern portions of Westchester)

 K-8 schools
 Everglades K-8 Center

 Middle schools
 Rockway Middle School
 West Miami Middle School (outside of the CDP but serving a section of the CDP)

 Elementary schools
 Banyan Elementary School
 Coral Park Elementary School
 Emerson Elementary School
 Rockway Elementary School
 Olympia Heights Elementary School (in University Park CDP, serves a southwest section of Westchester CDP)

Private schools
Roman Catholic private schools are operated by and/or are affiliated with the Roman Catholic Archdiocese of Miami.
 Christopher Columbus High School - Catholic private school
 St. Brendan High School - Catholic private school
 St. Agatha Catholic School (Catholic private school; in University Park CDP)
 St. Brendan Elementary School (Catholic private school)
 King's Christian
Gladeview Christian
 Florida Christian School - Olympia Heights

Universities and colleges
 Florida International University (formerly in the University Park CDP)
 St. John Vianney College Seminary - Catholic private college

Public libraries
Miami-Dade Public Library operates the Westchester Regional Library.

Miscellaneous education
The Miami Hoshuko, a supplementary weekend Japanese school, holds its classes at the Iglesia Bautista de Coral Park ("Coral Park Baptist Church") in Westchester. The school offices are located in Doral. The school was established in 1984.

See also

 List of census-designated places in Florida

References

Further reading
 
  - Westchester is on pages 71 and 86

External links

 History and Development of the Westchester community - Florida International University

Census-designated places in Miami-Dade County, Florida
Cuban-American culture in Florida
Historic Jewish communities in the United States